Karim Zekri was an Egyptian footballer.

Career
Zekri is currently the club captain of Al-Masry. Zekri made his name at Al-Masry, and became renowned for his good heading and marking ability.

As the captain of the Egyptian Under-21 national team, he reportedly turned down offers from Al Ahly to join Zamalek SC, the club he supports. He then joined Petrojet before returning to his original team, Al-Masry, where he is the fan favourite.

After controversy about Al-Masry's league status in 2012, he signed for Telephonat Bani Sweif on loan before returning in summer 2013.

Port Said Stadium disaster
At the time of the Port Said Stadium disaster which led to over 70 deaths, Zekri was captain of the home team Al-Masry. After the massacre, Zekri went on record saying that the police, army and ex-regime all incited the massacre.

Personal
Karim is the twin brother of striker Mohamed Zekri.

Honors

with Zamalek
Egyptian Cup (2008)

References

1985 births
Living people
Egyptian footballers
Al Masry SC players
Zamalek SC players
Petrojet SC players
Egyptian twins
Twin sportspeople
Sportspeople from Port Said
Egyptian Premier League players
Association football defenders
Telephonat Beni Suef SC players